Mary Sue Terry (born September 28, 1947) is an American Democratic politician from the Commonwealth of Virginia.

Early life
Terry was born the daughter of Nathaniel Chatham Terry and Nannie Ruth Terry in Martinsville, Virginia. She was an active and enthusiastic Democrat as a child.

She was graduated from Hardin-Reynolds Memorial School in Critz, Virginia in 1965.  She earned a BA in political science from the University of Richmond's Westhampton College in 1969, master's in government (1970) and law (1973) degrees from the University of Virginia and its law school.

Early career
Terry was a member of the Virginia House of Delegates (1978–1986) and assistant Commonwealth's Attorney in Patrick County, Virginia 1973–1977.  She successfully argued eight cases before the Supreme Court of the United States. She successfully negotiated a nationwide recall of 13,000 defective Ford ambulances and led a successful investigation and prosecution of individuals and corporations associated with Lyndon LaRouche.  From 1990 to 1991 Terry was president of the National Association of Attorneys General and in 1992 she received the Wyman Award, which is the association's highest honor. The Commonwealth of Virginia's courts did not allow prisoners to bring new exculpatory evidence more than three weeks after sentencing. Attorney General Terry once said that "Evidence of innocence is irrelevant."

Attorney general
She was elected attorney general in 1985 and reelected in 1989, becoming the first woman elected to statewide office in Virginia, the second woman to serve as attorney general of any U.S. state, and the first non-federal elected official in Virginia to garner more than one million votes in a single election. In 1989, she considered running for governor, but deferred to her fellow Democrat, then-Lieutenant Governor of Virginia L. Douglas Wilder, who became the first elected African-American Governor of any U.S. state.

Candidate for governor
She was Attorney General of Virginia from 1986 until 1993, when she resigned to run for Governor of Virginia against Republican George Allen. Allen won the November 1993 election despite Terry's early and significant lead. Her unpopular gun-control stance alienated her rural base voters. Her campaign was "lacklustre", and the religious right was a factor even though Michael Farris lost his bid to be Lieutenant Governor of Virginia. Her opponents also pointed out that she was unmarried, and perhaps less empathetic on family issues.

Life after candidacy
Following her defeat, Terry was a visiting professor at the University of Richmond's Jepson School of Leadership Studies. She served on the Board of Trustees at the University of Richmond from 1983 to 1991.

In 2007, Terry was consulting for Microsoft and nearby Ferrum College while living on her family farm in Patrick County, Virginia. Since 1978, she has been a partner in Terry & Rogers, and a partner in the B.H. Cooper Farm, Inc., both in Stuart.

In 2008, with Susan Platt and others, she formed "The Farm Team", a PAC to "help Democratic women seek elected office." In the last quarter of 2008 they raised $6696 and contributed $4000, including $1000 to Sharon Bulova's 2009 election campaign for Chairman of the Board of Supervisors in Fairfax County, Virginia. Miss Terry was featured speaker at a breakfast fundraiser planned in Richmond 7 February 2009, in connection with Jefferson-Jackson Day. That event was connected to a reception at the Governor's mansion, later canceled because Virginia law prohibits political fundraising by state officials while the Virginia General Assembly is in session. Democratic party officials argued the event did not violate that ban, because money had been collected before the session.

Awards and memberships
Service to Youth award, Virginia YMCA, 1981
Distinguished Alumna award University of Richmond, 1984
Patrick County-Stuart Chamber of Commerce (charter president and president, 1974–76)
West Piedmont Planning District Crime Commission (1974–77)
Ferrum College (President's board of advisors, 1978–83)
West Piedmont Health Planning Council (1975–77)
American Bar Association
Virginia State Bar
Virginia Trial Lawyers Association
Omicron Delta Kappa (1980)
University of Richmond (board of trustees)
Patrick Henry Mental Health Center (board of directors, 1975–77)
Virginia YMCA (board of directors)
First National Bank of Stuart (board of directors, chairman)
Library of Virginia, Virginia Women in History (2009)

See also
Attorney General of Virginia
Commonwealth of Virginia
Governor of Virginia
List of female state attorneys general in the United States

References

External links
Historical Bio for Mary Sue Terry (Virginia House of Delegates) Session 1985
Historical Bio for Mary Sue Terry (Virginia House of Delegates) Session 1980
Terry's profile at the Library of Virginia

|-

1947 births
Baptists from Virginia
Living people
Democratic Party members of the Virginia House of Delegates
People from Martinsville, Virginia
People from Patrick County, Virginia
Westhampton College alumni
University of Virginia School of Law alumni
Virginia Attorneys General
Women state legislators in Virginia
Candidates in the 1993 United States elections